William Hamilton Bell (October 14, 1923 – November 24, 2019) was a Canadian football player who played for the Toronto Argonauts, mostly as a back-up halfback and quarterback. He won the Grey Cup with them in 1945, 1946 and 1947.

References

Canadian football running backs
Toronto Argonauts players
Players of Canadian football from Nova Scotia
People from Yarmouth, Nova Scotia
1923 births
2019 deaths